Perseus Freeing Andromeda is a painting by the Flemish artist Peter Paul Rubens, done in 1622. It is now in the Gemäldegalerie,  Berlin, Germany.

The painting belonged the M. Pasquier collection in Rouen, which was auctioned in 1755 in Paris. In the 18th century it entered the collection of Frederick II of Prussia and, in 1830, it became part of the Berlinese museum collection.

The scene is similar to another 'Perseus Freeing Andromeda by Rubens now in the Hermitage Museum of St. Petersburg. It depicts the Greek mythology hero Perseus in the act of freeing Andromeda, after defeating the sea monster which kept her as prisoner. Perseus, wearing helmet, cuirass and cloak, is sided by two puttoes, and one of them  is helping him in removing the ropes that tie Andromeda to the rock.

On the left, two puttoes are playing with Pegasus, Perseus' winged horse.

Gallery

Sources
 

 

1620 paintings
Mythological paintings by Peter Paul Rubens
Paintings of Andromeda
Nude art
Paintings in the Gemäldegalerie, Berlin
Paintings of children
Horses in art
Angels in art
Water in art